Supershow (later with the subtitle "The Last Great Jam of the 60's!") is a music documentary film made in 1969 directed by John Crome and produced by Tom Parkinson. Tom Keylock, the Rolling Stones road manager was another figure pivotal in the production of this show.

This film was intended to be Britain's first music super session, with several famous blues, jazz and rock artists of the time coming together to be filmed whilst performing. The project was instigated by the Colour Tel film company, the recent credits of which included The Rolling Stones Rock and Roll Circus and Jimi Hendrix at Royal Albert Hall.

Filming took place over a two-day period in March 1969 in a disused linoleum factory at Staines, England. Artists who were filmed on 25 March included Led Zeppelin, Buddy Guy, Jack Bruce, Buddy Miles, Dick Heckstall-Smith and Chris Mercer. Those filmed on 26 March included Eric Clapton, Jon Hiseman's Colosseum, Buddy Guy, Roland Kirk and Stephen Stills. This project also marks one of the rare film appearances of Glenn Ross Campbell and The Misunderstood. Allegedly Jimi Hendrix was due to appear but missed the plane from New York City.

The whole project was planned with great secrecy and filming went ahead at a reputed cost of £100 per minute.

The film received a limited run in London, premiering at the Lyceum Theatre in November 1969. It later emerged as an official video release by Virgin Vision in 1986.

Footage of Led Zeppelin's performance of the song "Dazed and Confused" which was originally filmed for Supershow later appeared on the Led Zeppelin DVD in 2003.

Track listing

References

External links
 

1969 films
Documentary films about rock music and musicians
1969 documentary films
British documentary films
Staines-upon-Thames
1960s British films